Thomas Pollock (1654–1722) was a Scottish farmer and lawyer who served as the acting governor of North Carolina from 1712 to 1714 and 1722.

Biography 
Thomas Pollock was born on 6 May 1654 in Glasgow, Scotland, to Thomas Pollock of Balgra. He moved to the newly formed Carolina in 1683, as the deputy of Lord Proprietor Peter Carteret. He was a member of the Provincial Council. He was a known slave owner, and was reported to own about one hundred slaves.

References

External links

 

American slave owners
Burials at St. Paul's Church, Edenton
Governors of North-Carolina (1712–1776)
Members of the North-Carolina Provincial Council
Presidents of the North-Carolina Provincial Council
People from Glasgow